Brady Ellison (born October 27, 1988) is an American archer who competes in recurve archery. He is currently a Resident Athlete at the United States Olympic Training Center in Chula Vista, California. He holds the record for the longest continuous period as the world number-one-ranked men's recurve archer, from August 2011 to April 2013.  He earned his nickname "The Prospector" during the 2015 world championships due to his proclivity for 'finding gold'.

Personal life

As a child, Ellison suffered from Legg–Calvé–Perthes disease and wore leg braces for some time. He has had subsequent health issues with his knees, particularly in the lead-up to and during the Rio 2016 Olympic Games, and the fingers of his drawing hand.

Ellison married Slovenian archer Toja Černe (now known as Toja Ellison) in April 2016. He credits his wife with introducing him to alternative medicine, which was used to cure pain in his fingers in late 2018. The pair had their first child in November 2020.

Ellison started archery as a child in Arizona. Initially, Ellison shot with a compound and represented the United States internationally as a youth archer with the bowstyle. He switched to recurve on the recommendation of coaches at the national training center in Chula Vista, California, where he has spent much of his time.

Career

Olympics
At the 2008 Summer Olympics in Beijing, Ellison finished his ranking round with a total of 664 points, which gave him the 15th seed for the final competition bracket in which he faced John Burnes in the first round. Ellison won the match 111–89 and advanced to the second round. Here he was unable to beat another Canadian Jay Lyon, who was too strong with 113–107. Together with Butch Johnson and Vic Wunderle he also took part in the team event. With his 664 score from the ranking round combined with the 653 of Johnson and the 652 of Wunderle the Americans were in 10th position after the ranking round. In the first round they lost to Chinese Taipei, 222–218.

Ellison secured his spot for the 2012 Olympics at the USA Archery's Olympic Trials in Colorado Springs, Colorado. He is sponsored by Solve Media, Hoyt Archery, Easton Arrows, and Axcel Sight and Scopes, among others. He won a silver team medal together with his teammates Jake Kaminski and Jacob Wukie.

At the 2016 Rio Games Ellison, won individual bronze and team silver medals.

He represented the United States at the 2020 Summer Olympics held in Tokyo, Japan. He lost to Mete Gazoz of Turkey in the quarterfinals of the men's individual event.

World Championships
Ellison won medals at several editions of the World Archery Championships.

Two months after the 2020 Summer Olympics, he won the silver medal in the men's team event at the 2021 World Archery Championships held in Yankton, United States. He also won the bronze medal in the men's individual event.

The World Games
At three editions of The World Games (2013, 2017 and 2022), Ellison won the silver medal in the individual field recurve competition.

Other

In 2022, he won the men's recurve event at the Vegas Shoot held in Las Vegas, United States.

Pop culture
Ellison appeared in an episode of the American-based TV show Mythbusters, where he helped to test the myth of the Ancient Greek 'arrow machine gun' (a mythical device that could fire arrows in a way similar to modern machine guns). With Ellison's help, the myth was deemed plausible.

Individual performance timeline in Outdoor Recurve

References

External links

 

1988 births
Living people
American male archers
Sportspeople from Glendale, Arizona
21st-century American people
Archers at the 2008 Summer Olympics
Archers at the 2012 Summer Olympics
Archers at the 2016 Summer Olympics
Archers at the 2020 Summer Olympics
Olympic silver medalists for the United States in archery
Olympic bronze medalists for the United States in archery
Medalists at the 2012 Summer Olympics
Medalists at the 2016 Summer Olympics
Archers at the 2007 Pan American Games
Archers at the 2011 Pan American Games
Archers at the 2015 Pan American Games
Archers at the 2019 Pan American Games
Pan American Games medalists in archery
Pan American Games gold medalists for the United States
Pan American Games silver medalists for the United States
Pan American Games bronze medalists for the United States
Medalists at the 2007 Pan American Games
Medalists at the 2011 Pan American Games
Medalists at the 2015 Pan American Games
Medalists at the 2019 Pan American Games
World Archery Championships medalists
Competitors at the 2013 World Games
Competitors at the 2017 World Games
Competitors at the 2022 World Games
World Games medalists in archery
World Games silver medalists